Yang Chin-kuei (born September 30, 1987) is a Taiwanese swimmer, who specialized in butterfly and freestyle events. She represented the Chinese Taipei national team in two editions of the Olympic Games (2004 and 2008).

Yang made her own swimming history, as a 16-year-old teen, at the 2004 Summer Olympics in Athens, where she competed in the women's 200 m freestyle. Swimming at the middle lane in heat one, Yang held on with Thailand's Pilin Tachakittiranan throughout the race before fading herself down the stretch to hit the wall in second place and thirty-sixth overall by just 0.36 of a second at a relatively slow 2:05.65.

At the 2008 Summer Olympics in Beijing, Yang extended her swimming program to four events, including the butterfly double. On the first day of the competition, she swam the second heat to third place and forty-third overall in the 100 m butterfly at 1:01.60, edging out Turkey's Iris Rosenberger in a sprint race by close 0.07-second margin. The following day, Yang placed fortieth in the 400 m freestyle, with a time of 4:24.78, and was able to attain her well-improved time of 2:02.84, for a 37th-place finish in the 200 m freestyle. For her final event, 200 m butterfly, Yang swam in the second heat, against six other competitors including Singapore's Tao Li, who placed fifth in the 100 m butterfly final. She finished the race in sixth place by approximately one third of a second (0.33), behind Tao, with a time of 2:13.26. After placing twenty-ninth in the overall rankings of her final event, Yang, however, failed to advance into the later rounds.

References

External links
 NBC 2008 Olympics profile

1987 births
Living people
Taiwanese female butterfly swimmers
Taiwanese female freestyle swimmers
Olympic swimmers of Taiwan
Swimmers at the 2004 Summer Olympics
Swimmers at the 2008 Summer Olympics
Swimmers at the 2006 Asian Games
Swimmers at the 2014 Asian Games
World Games bronze medalists
Sportspeople from Kaohsiung
Competitors at the 2009 World Games
Asian Games competitors for Chinese Taipei
Taiwanese lifesaving athletes
20th-century Taiwanese women
21st-century Taiwanese women